The Mercy Bowl was the name to two one-off charity bowl games played at the  Los Angeles Memorial Coliseum in Los Angeles, California. The first was played between Fresno State University and Bowling Green State University on November 23, 1961, as a special fundraiser in memory of sixteen Cal Poly-San Luis Obispo football players killed in a plane crash following a game against Bowling Green a year earlier. The game raised $200,000 for the surviving widows and children and for a memorial in their honor.  A second Mercy Bowl was staged in 1971 between CSUF and Fresno State University to benefit the fourteen surviving children of three CSUF assistant coaches and a pilot who died in an airplane crash a month earlier.

Game results

See also
 List of college bowl games

References

Defunct college football bowls
Cal Poly Mustangs football
1961 in American football
1971 in American football
1961 in sports in California
1971 in sports in California